Asiagone is a genus of spiders in the family Linyphiidae. It was first described in 2014 by Tanasevitch. , it contains 4 species, all from Asia.

References

Linyphiidae
Araneomorphae genera
Spiders of Asia